Aaron Michael Falzon (born May 19, 1996) is a Maltese professional basketball player for Mulhouse Basket Agglomération of the Nationale Masculine 1. He also plays on the Malta national basketball team. He played college basketball for the Northwestern Wildcats and Quinnipiac Bobcats.

High school career
Falzon graduated from Northfield Mount Hermon School in 2015. As a senior, he was named NEPSAC AAA player of the year. He led NMH to a 26–9 record and averaged 17.7 points per game while grabbing 6.1 rebounds per game. He also made 114 3-pointers during his senior year.

Recruiting
Falzon finished high school as a 4-star recruit and the 75th ranked player in the class of 2015 according to ESPN.

|}

College career

Northwestern
As a freshman (2015–2016) Falzon played in all 32 games and started in 29 contests. He made a total of 63 3-pointers, the second most ever by a Northwestern freshman. In his debut, Falzon scored 20 points, which is a school record by a freshman in his debut. As a sophomore (2016–2017) Falzon played in only 3 games before redshirting and having season ending knee surgery.

As a redshirt sophomore (2017–2018) played in only 28 games due to injury and started in 10 of those games. He shot 37.5% from the 3-point line while averaging 5.5 points a game. Against Minnesota, Falzon scored 8 points without registering a field goal attempt as he shot 8–8 from the free throw line.

During his final year as a Wildcat (2018–19) Falzon was once again limited due to injury. He played in only 17 contests and started only 4 games. He scored a career high 21 points against Indiana after only scoring 6 points in 3 games prior to the game. He finished the season averaging 3.9 points per game.

Quinnipiac
Falzon committed to Quinnipiac as a graduate transfer in the spring of 2019. He scored 24 points against Monmouth. He averaged 7.8 points and 2.9 rebounds per game in his only season at Quinnipiac.

Professional career
On September 14, 2020, Falzon signed his first professional contract with Etoile Angers Basket of the Nationale Masculine 1. On December 4, 2020, Falzon signed a one-season contract with Leicester Riders of the British Basketball League (BBL). He averaged 4.1 points and 2.5 rebounds per game. On August 9, 2021, Falzon signed with the Traiskirchen Lions of the Austrian Basketball Bundesliga.

National team career
Falzon has represented Malta in several international tournaments. He participated in the 2021 FIBA European Championship for Small Countries and helped Malta win bronze. Falzon had a 38-point game against Gibraltar and averaged 23.0 points, 7.0 rebounds and 2.3 assists per game. He was named to the All-Star Five.

Career statistics

College

|-
| style="text-align:left;"| 2015–16
| style="text-align:left;"| Northwestern
| 32 || 29 || 24.5 || .383 || .354 || .717 || 3.4 || .9 || .3 || .3 || 8.4
|-
| style="text-align:left;"| 2016–17
| style="text-align:left;"| Northwestern
| 3 || 0 || 6.7 || .000 || .000 || – || .7 || 1.0 || .0 || .3 || .0
|-
| style="text-align:left;"| 2017–18
| style="text-align:left;"| Northwestern
| 28 || 10 || 16.0 || .349 || .375 || .853 || 1.7 || .5 || .3 || .2 || 5.5
|-
| style="text-align:left;"| 2018–19
| style="text-align:left;"| Northwestern
| 17 || 4 || 15.5 || .313 || .317 || .833 || 1.6 || .6 || .4 || .3 || 3.9
|-
| style="text-align:left;"| 2019–20
| style="text-align:left;"|  Quinnipiac
| 30 || 16 || 24.0 || .394 || .348 || .850 || 2.9 || .7 || .6 || .5 || 7.8
|- class="sortbottom"
| style="text-align:center;" colspan="2"| Career
| 110 || 59 || 20.3 || .370 || .349 || .792 || 2.5 || .7 || .4 || .3 || 6.6

Personal life
Aaron's brother is basketball player Tevin Falzon.

References

External links
Quinnipiac Bobcats bio
Northwestern Wildcats bio

1996 births
Living people
American men's basketball players
Basketball players from Massachusetts
Maltese men's basketball players
Northfield Mount Hermon School alumni
Northwestern Wildcats men's basketball players
Quinnipiac Bobcats men's basketball players
Power forwards (basketball)
Sportspeople from Newton, Massachusetts
Traiskirchen Lions players